Dawson County High School may refer to:

Dawson County High School (Dawsonville, Georgia)
Dawson County High School (Dawson County, Montana) Dawson County, Montana#Education